Til I Can Make It on My Own is the fifteenth studio album by American country music singer-songwriter Tammy Wynette. It was released on March 8, 1976, by Epic Records.

Commercial performance 
The album peaked at No. 3 on the Billboard Country Albums chart. The album's only single, Til I Can Make It on My Own", peaked at No. 1 on the Billboard Country Singles chart.

Album Notes 
"Easy Come, Easy Go" is a Dobie Gray cover from his 1975 album, New Ray of Sunshine.  Wynette also recorded a completely different song also called "Easy Come, Easy Go" on her 1981 album, You Brought Me Back, which is a Mama Cass Elliot cover from her 1969 album, Bubblegum, Lemonade, and... Something for Mama.

Track listing

Personnel
Adapted from the album liner notes.
Lou Bradley - engineer
Billy Sherrill - producer
Tammy Wynette - lead vocals

Chart positions

Album

Singles

References

1976 albums
Tammy Wynette albums
Epic Records albums
Albums produced by Billy Sherrill